"Gracias a Ti" (English: Thanks to You) is a song by Puerto Rican reggaeton duo Wisin & Yandel from their album, La Revolución (2009). The track was released as the third single from the album. A remixed version, featuring pop singer Enrique Iglesias was released on November 10, 2009.

Background
The song is written by Wisin & Yandel and produced by Nesty "La Mente Maestra", Victor "El Nasi" and "El Profesor" Gómez. The album version was released originally on October 1, 2009. Back on August, the remix version with additional vocals by Enrique Iglesias was recorded in Buenos Aires, Argentina, and released as the single version included on the re-release of La Revolución titled La Revolución: Evolution.

Music video

The music video used for the album version premiered on October 5, 2009. The video includes footage from their live performances on a concert in Luna Park in Buenos Aires.

In September, a music video for the remix version with Iglesias was filmed at the same place, which was released on November 2, 2009. It is the same concept from the video of the album version, only including footage from Iglesias on the performance. Both videos were directed by long-time Wisin & Yandel's collaborator Jessy Terrero and co-directed by Luis Carmona.

Charts

See also
Number-one hits of 2009 (U.S. Hot Latin Tracks)
List of number-one Billboard Hot Tropical Songs of 2009

References

External links
Official website

2009 singles
Wisin & Yandel songs
Enrique Iglesias songs
Spanish-language songs
Music videos directed by Jessy Terrero
Contemporary R&B ballads
Pop ballads
2009 songs
Songs written by Wisin
Songs written by Yandel
Machete Music singles